Michael Wornum (February 25, 1925 – June 15, 1995) was a British-American politician. He was born in London to a British father, George Grey Wornum, and an American mother, Miriam Alice Gerstle, and moved to California at a young age. He graduated from the University of California, Berkeley with a bachelor's degree in architecture, followed by a master's degree. He became a U.S. citizen in 1951. He served as a member of the California State Assembly from 1974 to 1978. He also served as  mayor of Mill Valley and Larkspur.

References

External links
Join California Michael Wornum

1925 births
1995 deaths
Politicians from London
People from Mill Valley, California
People from Larkspur, California
British emigrants to the United States
UC Berkeley College of Environmental Design alumni
Democratic Party members of the California State Assembly
Mayors of places in California
20th-century American politicians
Royal Air Force personnel of World War II